The Basilica of Saint Mary is a Roman Catholic minor basilica located on its own city block along Hennepin Avenue between 16th and 17th Streets in downtown Minneapolis, Minnesota. It was the first basilica established in the United States.  The Basilica of Saint Mary is the co-cathedral of the Roman Catholic Archdiocese of Saint Paul and Minneapolis.

History

The Basilica of Saint Mary replaced a previous church, the Church of the Immaculate Conception.  It was originally built in 1871, located at 3rd Street and 3rd Avenue North, but the expanding warehouse district was engulfing the church property.  Archbishop John Ireland announced plans for a new Church of the Immaculate Conception on Christmas Day, 1903.  In 1905, Lawrence S. Donaldson donated a one-block parcel on Hennepin Avenue near Loring Park for the new church buildings.  The design was awarded to Franco-American architect Emmanuel Louis Masqueray, the designer of the Cathedral of Saint Paul.  Masqueray designed it in a Beaux-Arts style.  The groundbreaking was held on August 7, 1907, with foundation construction continuing through May 1908.  The cornerstone was laid on May 31, 1908, with a ceremony involving 30,000 Catholics, twenty bishops, 300 priests and seminarians from the Saint Paul Seminary, and 500 cadets from the College of Saint Thomas.  As construction on the Basilica and the St. Paul Cathedral progressed, Masqueray's architectural genius attracted attention.  American Architect magazine commented, "The two Catholic Cathedrals will be -- when completed, noteworthy achievements in church building for any period; in extent and splendor they promise to surpass anything yet attempted in ecclesiastical work in the United States."
Civic dedication of the church took place on November 4, 1913, and the church was informally opened on May 31, 1914.  It was informally referred to as the Pro-Cathedral of the archdiocese from its beginning, but the parish was still officially named the Church of the Immaculate Conception until September 21, 1921.  It was formally named the Procathedral of Saint Mary at that time.  Although the building was open for worship in 1914, the interior decoration, windows, and plaster work were not completed until 1925.  It was established as a minor basilica by Pope Pius XI in 1926, making it the first basilica in the United States.

In 1941 the basilica was formally consecrated by Archbishop Dennis Dougherty of Philadelphia as part of the Ninth National Eucharistic Congress (which was taking place in Minneapolis and St. Paul at the time).

The building was added to the National Register of Historic Places in 1975. Its significance is due to three reasons: its excellent architecture and engineering design, as an expression of Baroque influence in church architecture; an example of the history of religious movements in Minnesota; and its place as the first basilica in the United States.

The foundation of the church is of Rockville granite. The main entrance is a colonnaded portico with two  spires on each side. The nave is lighted by five large arched stained glass windows. The marble altar is located underneath a  marble-columned baldacchino.

In 1991 its old copper roof was replaced, stopping the water leaks and damage and that were occurring.  In 2011, after being named one of 25 Twin City finalists, the building was the recipient of a $100,000 preservation grant from Partners in Preservation, chosen through a public vote; the funds were used to repair the narthex and sacristy of the Basilica, and help restore the paint and gold leaf found throughout the structure.

The basilica received minor fire damage during the rioting and arson that accompanied the 2020 George Floyd protests in Minneapolis–Saint Paul, with two pews being splashed with flammable liquid and burned.

Sound

The Basilica Cathedral Choir, a 90-voice auditioned, volunteer choir provides choral music on Sunday for the 9:30am Mass as well as on Holy Days of Obligation. The Basilica Cathedral Choir sings repertoire spanning a wide range of genres and covering many centuries. Music for vespers, confirmations, and special services is provided by the Schola Cantorum, a 12-voice professional choir.

The present Basilica organ was installed in 1949 as Wicks Opus No. 3047. The instrument includes several stops that were scaled and designed by Henry Vincent Willis IV of England as one of a few larger Wicks instruments installed throughout the United States in the 1930s and 1940s. After undergoing a complete renovation in Winter, 2008, including an entirely new relay and console, the organ now consists of 82 ranks on 4 manuals and pedal. The en-chamade Herald Trumpet is actually tuba-scale and modeled after the English town hall Willis tubas. Voiced on 25" wind, it is the most commanding such stop in the Upper Midwest.

Since 1996, the Basilica has hosted a variety of artists and musical ensembles through its artist-in-residence program. As of 2015, the following musical entities were in residence:
 Director of Music Teri Larson
 Composer Donald Krusback
 The Basilica Brass Ensemble
 The Minnesota Sinfonia
 The Rose Ensemble

The Saint Paul Chamber Orchestra also uses the Basilica as a venue.

Basilica Block Party

Since 1995, the site has been the venue for the annual Basilica Block Party music festival, which has been described as "summertime's hottest church party". The event raises money toward the ongoing restoration of the Basilica of St. Mary.

Known for

See also
List of Catholic cathedrals in the United States
List of cathedrals in the United States

References

External links

 Official Basilica Site
 Roman Catholic Archdiocese of Saint Paul and Minneapolis Official Site
 History of the Basilica
 Basilica of St Mary, Minneapolis at "MNopedia", Minnesota Historical Society by R.L. Cartwright, 2012 (CC-By-SA).
 Basilica Block Party
 Basilica of Saint Mary Digital Collection, Minnesota Reflections

Roman Catholic churches in Minneapolis
Mary, Minneapolis
Mary in Minneapolis
National Register of Historic Places in Minneapolis
Churches on the National Register of Historic Places in Minnesota
Roman Catholic churches completed in 1907
Churches in the Roman Catholic Archdiocese of Saint Paul and Minneapolis
Beaux-Arts architecture in Minnesota
Neoclassical architecture in Minnesota
Church buildings with domes
1871 establishments in Minnesota
20th-century Roman Catholic church buildings in the United States